RTRFM (call sign: 6RTR) is a not-for-profit, community radio station based in Perth, the state capital of Western Australia. It is self-funded, largely through listener subscription and fund-raising events. However, it does carry some "advertising material" (called sponsorship with all community broadcasters in Australia) at a maximum of 5 mins per hour. It broadcasts 24 hours a day, on 92.1 in the FM band. The name RTRFM is a contraction of "aRTy Radio".

Some 309,000 people over the age of 15 listen to RTRFM in any given month; that’s around 17% of those over 15 in Perth. Regular RTRFM listeners tune in for an average of around fifteen hours a week. The programming on RTRFM is diverse and broad, providing airtime for local music, dance music, jazz, electronica, blues, classic rock, metal, indie, LGBTQIA+ news, current affairs and more.

History 
The station that became RTRFM started off at the University of Western Australia. It was started on 1 April 1977, broadcasting with the callsign 6UWA. Shortly afterwards, Murdoch University got involved and the station's callsign was changed to 6UVS.

On 26 November 1990, the UWA Senate decided to close the radio station down and transmission was terminated that night. 6UVS was off the air for six months while negotiations between the University, volunteers at the station, and the Australian Broadcasting Authority were carried out. A public hearing was held, and it was determined that Universities Radio Ltd. (a joint company of UWA and Murdoch University) could become Arts Radio Ltd. with the callsign of 6RTR. The station remained based at UWA. Murdoch remained involved through the program Murdoch Magazine (later to become Morning Magazine and now The Mag).

In 2005, RTRFM moved from its old home in the Sanders Building at the University of Western Australia to its own premises on Beaufort Street in Mount Lawley, which is where it is located today. In 2017, RTRFM celebrated its fortieth anniversary with an exhibition at the State Library, a birthday celebration Neon Picnic, a donor drive and a concert at the Perth Concert Hall in November.

Programming 

RTRFM programming consists of fifty different programs which cover a host of issues and music genres including indie rock, indigenous music and current affairs, music of the 1960s and 1970s, experimental music, punk and hardcore, dance and electronic music, chill wave and many more.

Daily programs include Breakfast with Taylah (hosted by Taylah Strano), Out to Lunch, Full Frequency, and Drivetime. A recently released local feature album and RTRFM feature album are chosen each week to feature across all relevant RTRFM programming.

Events 
RTRFM has many annual flagship events including Dis-Order, Harbour Sundays, Neon Picnic, In the Pines, Radiothon, the Fremantle Winter Music Festival, and Courtyard Club.

Dis-Order
Dis-Order showcases some of Perth's finest heavy metal and punk acts.

Harbour Sundays
Since 2016, RTRFM and The Western Australian Museum have been working together to put on a live music series, Harbour Sundays, on the balcony of the WA Maritime Museum. The event usually runs across four Sundays in the month of February.

Neon Picnic
RTRFM's Neon Picnic, held at the Hyde Park Amphitheatre, features some of the best local music from bands on the radio now, and those that always have been. Neon Picnic is family friendly and free.

In the Pines
RTRFM's 'In the Pines' event is hosted annually at the University of Western Australia's Somerville Auditorium and celebrates local music talent from a variety of different genres.

Fremantle Winter Music Festival
RTRFM established the Fremantle Winter Music Festival in 2007, which has since been held annually in multiple venues throughout Fremantle. The event showcases both well-known and up-and-coming bands from Fremantle and Perth.

Radiothon
RTRFM's major fundraiser is known as Radiothon. The event is hosted over a ten-day period in August and encourages listeners to subscribe to the station. Radiothon is kicked off each year with an Opening Party event (and in some years, also features a Closing Party event).

Courtyard Club
Since 2014 RTRFM and The State Theatre Centre of WA have been putting on free concert series in the State Theatre Centre Courtyard. The free event runs on Friday nights in the lead up to Christmas.

References

External links 
 RTRFM official website
 Listen Online

Radio stations in Perth, Western Australia
Community radio stations in Australia